Kampung Puteh is a settlement in the Lawas division of Sarawak, Malaysia.

Neighbouring settlements include:

References

Populated places in Sarawak